Ntare IV of Nkore (died 1727), sometimes referred to as Ntare IV Nyakikoto Kitabanyoro, was the Omugabe of Nkore, a historic state located in what is now Uganda, from 1699 to 1727. The term "Omugabe" is translated in various ways, but is most commonly equated to "king".

The famous Ntare School in Mbarara has been named after this Omugabe.

References

External links
 World Statesmen – Uganda

Ugandan monarchies
1727 deaths
18th-century monarchs in Africa
Year of birth unknown